The Berkeley Eagles are an Australian rugby league football team based in Berkeley, a country town of the Illawarra region. The club are a part of Country Rugby League and has competed in the Illawarra competition.

History

Name and Emblem
The Eagles logo consists of the name "Eagles" in large font, with the name "Berkeley Sports" in smaller font above it. Underneath lies a picture of a white eagle. The font is in the team's colours.

The Berkeley Sports Eagles RLFC was formed in 1955 in the Illawarra juniors league and in 1965
a senior team was formed in Illawarra District Rugby League.

Colours
The team's colours are blue and gold.

Honours

Team
 Illawarra Rugby League Premierships: 2010 Second grade

Individuals

See also

References

External links 
 Berkeley Eagles Homepage
 Country Rugby League Homepage
 Country Rugby League
 Illawarra Rugby League Homepage
 Illawarra Rugby League

Rugby league teams in Wollongong
Rugby clubs established in 1955
1955 establishments in Australia